Televenezia is an Italian regional television channel of Veneto owned by TeleVenezia SRL group. It transmits a light entertainment program: movies, news and weather bulletins, documentary film and sports on LCN 19.

Other channels of own group are Televenezia Tg and Televenezia Cinema.

Programs in Italian 
TG Regione
TG Venezia
Laurel and Hardy
Tenta la Fortuna
Radio Venezia
Notizie dai Veneti per i Veneti
Almanacco Meteo (Meteorology)
Almanacco Maree (Acqua alta)
Superpass
Bikers Explorer
Agrisapori
Ultimo Km (Cycling)
Animated series
Casanova
Oggi le Comiche (comic)
A scuola di cucina

Staff
Giovanni Vindigni (owner)
Maria Stella Donà
Alberto Chinellato

References

External links 
site 
Youtube
Profile

Television channels in Italy
Television channels and stations established in 1977
Free-to-air
Italian-language television networks